Michael Shin (Shin Woo-hyun, born 23 August 2004) is a South Korean racing driver set to race in the 2023 GB3 Championship with Hitech Grand Prix. He made his competitive racing debut in the 2022 Formula 4 UAE Championship with JHR Developments, and competed in the 2022 F4 British Championship. The following year, he competed in the 2023 Formula Regional Middle East Championship with Prema Racing.

Career

Karting 
Shin did one year of karting in Korea, before moving to the United Kingdom to test Formula 4 machinery with JHR Developments, citing that karting in Korea "was not a good enough environment for me to progress".

Formula 4

2021 
Shin began testing Formula Renault 2.0 and Formula 4 cars in the United Kingdom with JHR Developments in 2021, being coached by former racing driver Callan O’Keefe. He took part in the official test day of the Brands Hatch GP round of the 2021 F4 British Championship with JHR Developments, finishing 17th of 18 competitors.

2022 
On 1 December 2021, it was announced that Shin would compete in the 2022 Formula 4 UAE Championship with JHR Developments. He finished 29th in the overall standings, and 7th in the Rookies’ Championship.

On 9 March 2022, it was announced that Shin would compete in the 2022 F4 British Championship with Virtuosi Racing alongside Edward Pearson. He achieved his first win in Race 2 of Round 2 at the Brands Hatch Indy circuit, and finished 11th in the standings.

FIA Motorsport Games

Formula 4 
Shin represented his native South Korea in the 2022 FIA Motorsport Games Formula 4 Cup.

Formula Regional Middle East Championship 
On 20 December 2022, it was announced that Shin would be competing in the 2023 Formula Regional Middle East Championship with Prema Racing.

GB3 Championship 
Shin made the step up to GB3 in 2023 with Hitech Grand Prix.

Racing record

Racing career summary 

* Season still in progress.

Complete Formula 4 UAE Championship results 
(key) (Races in bold indicate pole position) (Races in italics indicate fastest lap)

Complete F4 British Championship results 
(key) (Races in bold indicate pole position) (Races in italics indicate fastest lap)

Complete Formula Regional Middle East Championship results 
(key) (Races in bold indicate pole position) (Races in italics indicate fastest lap)

Complete GB3 Championship results 
(key) (Races in bold indicate pole position) (Races in italics indicate fastest lap)

* Season still in progress.

References

External links 

2004 births
Living people
South Korean racing drivers
British F4 Championship drivers
UAE F4 Championship drivers
FIA Motorsport Games drivers
Prema Powerteam drivers
JHR Developments drivers
Virtuosi Racing drivers
South Korean expatriate sportspeople in the United Kingdom
Formula Regional Middle East Championship drivers
Hitech Grand Prix drivers